Ligidium is a genus of woodlice. It contains about 46 species, six of which are probably taxonomic synonyms of Ligidium hypnorum or Ligidium germanicum. Of the remainder, eight species are found in North America, six in Japan, two in Taiwan, four in China, 12 in Turkey, the Caucasus, and Central Asia, and six in Greece.

Ligidium acutitelson Wang & Kwon, 1993
Ligidium anatolicum Frankenberger, 1950
Ligidium assimile Strouhal, 1971
Ligidium beieri Strouhal, 1928
Ligidium birsteini Borutzky, 1950
Ligidium blueridgensis Schultz, 1964
Ligidium bosniense Verhoeff, 1901
Ligidium bosporanum Verhoeff, 1941
Ligidium burmanicum Verhoeff, 1946
Ligidium cavaticum Borutzky, 1950
Ligidium cycladicum Matsakis, 1978
Ligidium denticulatum Shen, 1949
Ligidium elrodii (Packard, 1873)
Ligidium euboicum Matsakis, 1975
Ligidium floridanum Schultz & Johnson, 1984
Ligidium formosanum Wang & Kwon, 1993
Ligidium fragile Budde-Lund, 1885
Ligidium germanicum Verhoeff, 1901
Ligidium ghigii Arcangeli, 1928
Ligidium gracile (Dana, 1854)
Ligidium hoberlandti Frankenberger, 1950
Ligidium hypnorum (Cuvier, 1792)
Ligidium inerme Nunomura & Xie, 2000
Ligidium intermedium Radu, 1950
Ligidium iyoense Nunomura, 1983
Ligidium japonicum Verhoeff, 1918
Ligidium jiushai Tang & Zhou, 1999
Ligidium kiyosumiense Nunomura, 1983
Ligidium kofoidi Maloney, 1930
Ligidium koreanum Flasarová, 1972
Ligidium lapetum Mulaik & Mulaik, 1942
Ligidium longisetosum Verhoeff & Strouhal, 1967
Ligidium margaritae Borutzky, 1955
Ligidium mimense Nunomura & Xie, 2000
Ligidium mucronatum Mulaik & Mulaik, 1942
Ligidium mylonasi Sfenthourakis, 1992
Ligidium nodulosum Verhoeff, 1918
Ligidium paulum Nunomura, 1976
Ligidium riparum Verhoeff, 1943
Ligidium ryukyuense Nunomura, 1983
Ligidium shadini Borutzky, 1948
Ligidium tauricum Verhoeff, 1930
Ligidium turcicorum Verhoeff, 1949
Ligidium werneri Strouhal, 1937
Ligidium zaitzevi Borutzky, 1950
Ligidium zernovi Borutzky, 1948

References

Woodlice